Craig Dworkin is an American poet, critic, editor, and Professor of English at the University of Utah. He is founding senior editor of Eclipse, an online archive of 20th-century small-press writing and 21st-century born-digital publications.

Education and career 
Dworkin received his BA from Stanford University and his PhD from the University of California, Berkeley. He was an assistant and associate professor at Princeton University from 1998–2004 before joining the faculty at the University of Utah, where he is a Professor of English.

Dworkin has written a number of books of poetry, including Helicography (Punctum Books, 2021), The Pine-Woods Notebook (Kenning Editions, 2019), Def (Information as Material, 2018), Twelve Erroneous Displacements and a Fact (IAM, 2016), Alkali (Counterpath Press, 2015), The Crystal Text (After Clark Coolidge) (Compline, 2012), Motes (Roof Books, 2011), The Perverse Library (IAM, 2010), and Strand (Roof, 2005).

Dworkin is the author of four scholarly monographs: Radium of the Word: A Poetics of Materiality (Chicago, 2020); Dictionary Poetics: Toward a Radical Lexicography (Fordham, 2020); No Medium (MIT, 2013), in which he discusses works that are "blank, erased, clear, or silent"; and Reading the Illegible (Northwestern, 2003). Edited collections include Against Expression (co-edited with Kenneth Goldsmith, Northwestern, 2011), in which he coined the term "conceptual writing"; The Sound of Poetry / The Poetry of Sound, co-edited with Marjorie Perloff (Chicago, 2009); and The Consequence of Innovation: 21st Century Poetics (Roof, 2008). He has published articles in such diverse journals as October, Grey Room, Contemporary Literature, PMLA, and Critical Inquiry.

Dworkin is the founding senior editor of Eclipse, an online archive focusing on digital facsimiles of radical small-press writing from the last quarter of the 20th century. The archive has expanded to publish selected new works and include born-digital publications.

Works

Scholarly monographs

Edited collections 

 
 Craig Dworkin and Kenneth Goldsmith, eds. 
 Craig Dworkin and Marjorie Perloff, eds. 
   
   
 Craig Dworkin and María Eugenia Díaz Sánchez, eds.

Poetry books and pamphlets 

 
 
 
 
 
 
 
 
 Craig Dworkin and Madeline Gilmore.

References

External links 
 Eclipse Editor
 Eclipse Archive

University of California, Berkeley alumni
21st-century American poets
Stanford University alumni
1969 births
Living people
American male poets
21st-century American male writers
University of Utah faculty